The Lena O. Smith House is a house in Minneapolis, Minnesota, United States.  Its owner, Lena O. Smith, was a prominent civil rights attorney.  She was born in 1885 in Lawrence, Kansas and moved with her family to Minneapolis in 1906.  She enrolled at William Mitchell College of Law (then the Northwestern College of Law) and graduated in 1921.  Afterward, she opened her own law firm and became the first African-American attorney in Minneapolis.  In her practice, she fought for issues such as equal protection under the law, equal access to housing, and the right to join labor unions.  As an activist, she was a founder of the Minneapolis Urban League, and the first woman president of the Minneapolis chapter of the National Association for the Advancement of Colored People from 1935 through 1939.  Her house is listed on the National Register of Historic Places and designated as a local landmark in recognition to the African-American community in Minneapolis.

See also
 National Register of Historic Places listings in Hennepin County, Minnesota

References

External links

African-American history in Minneapolis–Saint Paul
Houses in Minneapolis
Houses on the National Register of Historic Places in Minnesota
National Register of Historic Places in Minneapolis